Hathor 28 - Coptic Calendar - Hathor 30

The twenty-ninth day of the Coptic month of Hathor, the third month of the Coptic year. On a common year, this day corresponds to November 25, of the Julian Calendar, and December 8, of the Gregorian Calendar. This day falls in the Coptic season of Peret, the season of emergence. This day falls in the Nativity Fast.

Commemorations

Feasts 

 Monthly commemoration of the Feasts of the Annunciation, Nativity, and Resurrection

Saints 

 The martyrdom of Pope Peter I, the Seal of the Martyrs, the seventeenth Patriarch of the See of Saint Mark 
 The martyrdom of Pope Clement I, the Patriarch of Rome 
 the martyrdom of Saint Cathrine of Alexandria

References 

Days of the Coptic calendar